Vladimir Chernenko (born 15 April 1981) is a Uzbekistani rower. He competed in the men's single sculls event at the 2004 Summer Olympics.

References

1981 births
Living people
Uzbekistani male rowers
Olympic rowers of Uzbekistan
Rowers at the 2004 Summer Olympics
Sportspeople from Chuvashia
Asian Games medalists in rowing
Rowers at the 2006 Asian Games
Rowers at the 2010 Asian Games
Asian Games gold medalists for Uzbekistan
Medalists at the 2006 Asian Games
21st-century Uzbekistani people